Here Anonymous is the second studio album of Los Angeles-based indie rock group Eulogies, released by Dangerbird Records on April 7, 2009 on CD as well as 12" vinyl.

The album was co-produced by Peter Walker and Hrishikesh Hirway (The One A.M. Radio), who also worked together on Eulogies' self-titled debut album in 2007. Noted producer Tony Hoffer served as executive producer and mixer of the album. Founding member and bassist Tim Hutton left the band shortly after recording resumed for this album, and he was replaced by Garrett Deloian in January 2009. Guitarist Drew Phillips makes his recording debut with the band on Here Anonymous as well.

Nikki Monniger, bassist and singer for the indie rock band Silversun Pickups provides vocals on the single "Two Can Play"

Track listing
All songs written by Peter Walker.
 "Day to Day" – 3:24
 "Eyes on the Prize" – 3:01
 "Bad Connection" – 3:28
 "Two Can Play" (featuring Nikki Monninger) – 2:21
 "How to Be Alone" – 3:35
 "This Fine Progression" – 4:33
 "Out of Character" – 3:24
 "A Dark Place" – 2:10
 "Goodbye" – 3:06
 "The Fight (I've Come to Like)" – 3:59
 "Stranger Calliope" – 3:59
 "Is There Anyone Here?" – 4:05

Credits
 Peter Walker – vocals, guitar, keyboards
 Tim Hutton – bass, backing vocals
 Chris Reynolds – drums
 Drew Phillips – guitar
 Produced by Peter Walker and Hrishikesh Hirway
 Executive produced and mixed by Tony Hoffer
 Engineered by Ryan Hewitt
 Guest vocals on "Two Can Play" by Nikki Monninger
 Guest flute on "Stranger Calliope" by Laura Darlington
 Guest guitar throughout by Hrishikesh Hirway
 Jeff Castelaz – A&R
 Glenn Davis – legal representation

References

2009 albums
Eulogies (band) albums